TU6SPA (ТУ6СПА) is a Soviet, later Russian diesel locomotive and mobile power station for  track gauge.

History
Diesel locomotive TU6SPA (ТУ6СПА) is a sub-type of the TU8 diesel locomotive equipped with an electric generator used for energy supply to non self-propelled heavy-duty track machines. The TU6SPA was developed in 1987–1993 at the Kambarka Engineering Works to replace the aging locomotive classes TU6SRP (ТУ6СРП). The cab is equipped with efficient heat-system, refrigerator, radio-set and air conditioning.

Additional specifications
 Electric generator
 Number of seats in the cabin – 6
 Distance between bogies – 
 Base of bogies –

See also
Narrow gauge railways
Kambarka Engineering Works

References

External links

 Series locomotives (Russian language)
 Diesel locomotive - mobile power stations (Russian language)
 Track renewal train for gauge 750mm (Russian language)

750 mm gauge locomotives
Diesel locomotives of the Soviet Union
Diesel locomotives of Russia
Diesel locomotives of Ukraine